Qeshlaq-e Vosta (also Romanized as Qeshlāq-e Vosţá; also known as Qeshlāq) is a village in Khodabandehlu Rural District, in the Central District of Sahneh County, Kermanshah Province, Iran. At the 2006 census, its population was 21, in 5 families.

References 

Populated places in Sahneh County